(born 8 May 1981 in Kanagawa) is a former medley swimmer from Japan. She won the silver medal in the 400m Individual Medley at the 2000 Summer Olympics in Sydney, Australia.

References
 databaseOlympics
 Profile on FINA-site

1981 births
Living people
Olympic swimmers of Japan
Swimmers at the 2000 Summer Olympics
Olympic silver medalists for Japan
Sportspeople from Kanagawa Prefecture
Japanese female medley swimmers
World Aquatics Championships medalists in swimming
Asian Games medalists in swimming
Medalists at the 2000 Summer Olympics
Olympic silver medalists in swimming
Asian Games gold medalists for Japan
Asian Games silver medalists for Japan
Swimmers at the 1998 Asian Games
Medalists at the 1998 Asian Games